Joseph Swain (June 16, 1857 – May 19, 1927) served as the ninth president of Indiana University and also as the sixth president of Swarthmore College.

Summary

Education 

 Indiana University (B.L. 1883, M.S. 1885)
 Wabash College (LL.D. 1893)

Career 

 Professor of mathematics and biology at Indiana University (1883–1891)
 Professor of mathematics at Stanford University (1891–1893)
 President of Indiana University (1893-1902)
 President of Swarthmore College (1902-1921)

Biography 

Joseph Swain was IU's first Indiana-born president. He was born in Pendleton, Indiana, to Woolston and Mary A. Swain.  Swain attended IU as an undergraduate and graduate student. He matriculated in 1879 and graduated with a B.L. degree in 1883.  From 1883-1885, he was an instructor of mathematics and biology at IU while he completed his graduate education and graduated with a M.S. degree in 1885.  Starting in 1885, Swain was an associate professor of mathematics until 1886, where he then was professor for five years until 1891.  He left his professorship at IU in 1891 to follow departing IU president David Starr Jordan to Stanford University, where he taught as a professor of mathematics.  In 1893, Swain received an honorary LL.D. degree from Wabash College.  Swain returned to IU in 1893 to serve as IU's ninth president, succeeding John Coulter.  He met Frances M. Morgan, of Knightstown, Indiana, while teaching at IU and they went on to marry on September 22, 1885.   Swain accepted the invitation to serve as President for Swarthmore College in 1902 until 1921.  He retired from Swarthmore in 1921 as President Emeritus and died six years later from heart disease in Clifton Heights, Pennsylvania, on May 19, 1927. He is buried in his hometown of Pendleton in Friends Cemetery.

IU Administration

Swain served as IU's president from 1893 to 1902.  During that time, he established Kirkwood Hall in 1894; a gymnasium for men in 1896, which later was named Assembly Hall; Kirkwood Observatory in 1900; and he began construction for Science Hall in 1901.  During his presidency, student enrollment increased from 524 to 1,285.

Associations

Swain was the ex-president of the Indiana State Teachers Association, member of the Section on Higher Education of the National Council on Education, member of the World Peace Foundation and served as president of the N.E.A. from 1913-1914.

Tributes

In 1940, Indiana University opened a new physical science building which they called Swain Hall (now known as Swain Hall West). In 1960, The building was expanded by the incorporation of the former Biology Hall, which became Swain Hall East. The entire complex is known as Swain Hall.

In 2016, Indiana University renamed the Student Building to the Frances Morgan Swain Student Building to honor his wife Frances for her work in trying to increase women enrollments and make it easier for women to acquire a college education during the 1890s.

See also
:Category:Taxa named by Joseph Swain (academic)

References

Further reading
 Clark, Thomas D. Indiana University: Vol. I: The Early Years (1970)

External links
 
  This source claims he made post-graduate studies in Scotland.
Indiana University President's Office records, 1893-1902, Indiana University Archives

Wabash College alumni
Indiana University alumni
Indiana University faculty
Stanford University Department of Mathematics faculty
Presidents of Swarthmore College
1927 deaths
1857 births
People from Pendleton, Indiana
Presidents of Indiana University